The following is a list of notable people associated with Seton Hall University, located in the American city of South Orange, New Jersey.

Notable alumni

Academics
 Malcolm Diamond (Ed.S., 1985), Professor Emeritus of Religion at Princeton University
 Shana O. Kelley (B.S., 1994), professor and director of Biomolecular Sciences at the University of Toronto
 Donato LaRossa (B.A., 1963), Professor Emeritus of Surgery at the University of Pennsylvania School of Medicine

Business
William F. Andrews, former chairman of the Singer Corporation and the Corrections Corporation of America
 Robert E. Brennan, former First Jersey Securities CEO, convicted of securities fraud and bankruptcy fraud
 Dennis Kozlowski (B.Sc., 1968), former CEO of Tyco International, later convicted of securities fraud
 George Kurtz (born c. 1970), co-founder and CEO of cybersecurity company CrowdStrike, who was the founder of Foundstone and chief technology officer of McAfee.
 Orin R. Smith (M.B.A., 1964), former chairman and CEO of Engelhard Corporation

Government and politics
 Harold A. Ackerman (B.A.), federal judge for the United States District Court for the District of New Jersey
 Liu He, incumbent Vice Premier of the People's Republic of China and former director of the Central Financial and Economic Affairs Commission Office
 John O. Bennett (J.D., 1974), former New Jersey state senator and acting governor
 Michael Chagares (J.D., 1987), federal judge on the United States Court of Appeals
 Raymond G. Chambers (M.B.A., 1968), currently serves as United Nations Secretary-General's Special Envoy for Malaria
 Chris Christie (J.D., 1987), former Governor of New Jersey, United States Attorney for the District of New Jersey
 Jack Ciattarelli (B.S. and M.B.A.), Republican nominee in the 2021 New Jersey gubernatorial election
 Clay Constantinou, former United States Ambassador to Luxembourg
 Marion Crecco, member of the New Jersey General Assembly from 1986 to 2002.
 William Howe Davis (1904–1982), politician who served as Mayor of Orange, New Jersey for 12 years and as the director of the New Jersey Division of Alcoholic Beverage Control during the Administration of Governor Robert B. Meyner.
 Lucille Davy (B.Sc.), New Jersey Commissioner of Education.
 Patrick J. Diegnan, representative and Parliamentarian of the New Jersey General Assembly
 Donald DiFrancesco (J.D., 1969), former Governor of New Jersey
 Arline Friscia (B.A.), member of the New Jersey General Assembly.
 Thomas W. Greelish (J.D., 1971), United States Attorney for the District of New Jersey from 1985 to 1987.
 Mims Hackett (M.S.), New Jersey General Assembly
 Jerramiah Healy (J.D., 1975), Mayor of Jersey City, New Jersey
 Anthony Impreveduto (M.A.), served in the New Jersey General Assembly from 1987 to 2004.
 LeRoy J. Jones, Jr. (B.S.), member of the New Jersey General Assembly
 Nicole Malliotakis (B.S. 2001), Member of the U.S. House of Representatives from Staten Island.
 Thomas F. McCran (B.S., 1896), New Jersey Attorney General 1919–1924
 Cornelius Augustine McGlennon (B.A., 1899), represented  from 1919 to 1921, and was Mayor of East Newark from 1907 to 1919.
 John F. McKeon (J.D., 1983), New Jersey General Assembly
 Mike Pappas (B.A., 1982), U.S. Congressman  from New Jersey
 Donald M. Payne (B.A., 1957), U.S. Congressman from New Jersey
 Eugene A. Philbin (M.A., LL.D, 1884), Manhattan District Attorney and New York Supreme Court Justice
 Anthony Principi (J.D., 1975), 4th United States Secretary of Veterans Affairs
Matthew John Rinaldo (M.B.A., 1959), United States House of Representatives for twenty years, in New Jersey's 12th and 7th congressional districts.
 Richie Roberts (J.D., 1970), detective and attorney responsible for the arrest and prosecution of Frank Lucas, as portrayed in the film American Gangster by Russell Crowe
Louis Romano, member of the New Jersey General Assembly
Thomas J. Scully (B.A., 1889), New Jersey's 3rd congressional district 1911–21; mayor of South Amboy, 1909–10, 1921
 Ellen Tauscher (B.Sc., 1974), Undersecretary of State for Arms Control and International Security, former U.S. Congresswoman from California
 George J. Terwilliger III (B.A., 1973), U.S. Deputy Attorney General 1991–93
 John P. Washington, U.S. Army Chaplain and Chaplain's Medal for Heroism recipient
 Maj. Charles Watters, U.S. Army Chaplain and Medal of Honor recipient
 John Wisniewski (J.D., 1987), Former Chair of the New Jersey Democratic State Committee 2011-2013, Former Member of the New Jersey General Assembly 1996-2018

Culture

Media
 Father Jim Chern (M.Th., 1999), Catholic priest and co-host of "The Catholic Guy Show" on Sirius XM Satellite Radio
 Lisa Durden, media commentator
 Donna Fiducia, Fox News anchor
 Bob Ley, ESPN sports anchor
 Ed Lucas (BA, Communication, 1962) Emmy-winning blind Yankee broadcaster, YES Network
 Megan Olivi, sports broadcaster
 Bob Picozzi, sportscaster, ESPN Radio's Mike and Mike show
 Vinnie Politan (J.D.), Court TV anchor
 Bill Raftery (M.S.), CBS and ESPN college basketball analyst
 Pete Tauriello (B.A.), WINS traffic reporter
 Dick Vitale (B.Sc., 1963), ESPN sports anchor
 Bernie Wagenblast (B.A., Communications, 1978), WINS traffic reporter, "voice" of the New York City Subway System
 Robert J. Wussler (B.A., 1957), co-founder of CNN

Music
 Greg Garbowsky (dropped out), bass guitar player for the Jonas Brothers
 Naturi Naughton, actress, singer, and former member of 3LW
 Max Weinberg, drummer for Bruce Springsteen's E Street Band and bandleader of The Max Weinberg 7 on Late Night with Conan O'Brien
 Jimmy White Pop and AC artist.

TV and film
 Crystal Dickinson (1998), actress with credits in film, television, and in theater, and made her Broadway debut in Clybourne Park
 Daniel Acon (1981), Emmy Award-nominated special effects artist
 Ron Carey (B.A., 1956), actor
 Joe Louis Clark, former high school principal, and character in the 1989 film Lean on Me played by Morgan Freeman
 Chuck Connors, TV's "Rifleman", basketball player (Boston Celtics) and baseball player (Cubs and Dodgers)
 Robert Desiderio, actor and narrator
 Dulé Hill, actor
 Jim Hunter, MLB Baltimore Orioles TV and radio broadcaster
 Victor J. Kemper, cinematographer
 Josephine Siao, Hong Kong actress
 Bill Timoney (B.A., 1980), actor ("All My Children," "12 Monkeys") and voice actor ("Pokémon")
 E. Duke Vincent (1954), TV producer
 Raoul Walsh (B.A., 1908), film director and founding member of the Academy of Motion Picture Arts and Sciences
 Anthony Soprano (dropped out), reputed boss of the Di Meo crime family

Literature
 Niobia Bryant (B.A., 1996 and B.S.N., 1997) bestselling author (also writes as Meesha Mink)
 X.J. Kennedy (B.A., 1950),  poet

Art
Denis Masi, (B.A., 1964), artist

Science and technology
John J. Mooney (B.S., 1955), co-inventor of the three-way catalytic converter and co-winner of National Medal of Technology

Sports
 Lou Duva, International Boxing Hall of Fame trainer
 Louis Gaudinot (Criminal Justice), professional mixed martial artist; The Ultimate Fighter: Team Bisping vs. Team Miller competitor; current UFC Flyweight
 Andy Stanfield (B.A., 1952), two-time gold medalist sprinter

Baseball
 Craig Biggio, former Major League Baseball player for the Houston Astros and member of the Baseball Hall of Fame 
 Ed Blankmeyer, college baseball coach at St. John's
 Johnny Briggs, former Major League Baseball player, 1964–1975, for the Philadelphia Phillies, Milwaukee Brewers, and Minnesota Twins
 Frank Bruggy, former Major League Baseball player, 1921–1925, for the Philadelphia Phillies, Philadelphia Athletics, and Cincinnati Reds
 Rick Cerone, former Major League Baseball player, 1975–1992, for the Cleveland Indians, Toronto Blue Jays, New York Yankees, Atlanta Braves, Milwaukee Brewers, Boston Red Sox, New York Mets, and Montreal Expos
 Chuck Connors, former Major League Baseball player, 1949–1951, with the Brooklyn Dodgers and Chicago Cubs
 Danny Coombs, former Major League Baseball player, 1963–1971, for the Houston Astros and San Diego Padres
 Jack Ferry, former Major League Baseball player, 1910–1913, for the Pittsburgh Pirates
 Hank Fischer, former Major League Baseball player, 1962–1967, for the Milwaukee Braves, Cincinnati Reds, and Boston Red Sox
 Jason Grilli, current Major League Baseball player for the Atlanta Braves
 Bill Henry, former Major League Baseball player in 1966 for the New York Yankees
 Gene Hermanski, retired Major League Baseball outfielder, 1943–1953, with the Brooklyn Dodgers, Chicago Cubs, and Pittsburgh Pirates
 Kevin Leighton, college baseball coach at Manhattan and Fordham
 Ted Lepcio, former Major League Baseball player, 1952–1961, for the Boston Red Sox, Detroit Tigers, Philadelphia Phillies, Chicago White Sox, and Minnesota Twins
 Ed Madjeski, former Major League Baseball player, 1932–1937, for the Philadelphia Athletics, Chicago White Sox, and New York Giants
 Mike Moriarty, former Major League Baseball player in 2002 for the Baltimore Orioles
 Dan Morogiello, former Major League Baseball player in 1983 for the Baltimore Orioles
 John Morris, former Major League Baseball, 1986–1992, for the St. Louis Cardinals, Philadelphia Phillies, and California Angels
 Matt Morris, former Major League Baseball player
 Kevin Morton, former Major League Baseball player in 1991 for the Boston Red Sox
 Steve Nagy, former Major League Baseball player, 1947–1950, with the Pittsburgh Pirates and Washington Senators
 Pat Pacillo, former Major League Baseball player
 Pepper Peploski, former Major League Baseball player in 1913 for the Detroit Tigers
 Charlie Puleo, former Major League Baseball player
 Otto Rettig, former Major League Baseball player in 1922 for the Philadelphia Athletics
 Rich Scheid, former Major League Baseball player, 1992–1995, for the Houston Astros and Florida Marlins
 Anthony Seratelli
 Joe Shannon, former Major League Baseball player in 1915 for the Boston Braves
 Red Shannon, former Major League Baseball player, 1915–1926, for the Boston Braves, Philadelphia Athletics, Boston Red Sox, Washington Senators, and Chicago Cubs
 Mike Sheppard, former Seton Hall baseball coach
 Rob Sheppard, Seton Hall baseball coach
 John Valentin, retired Major League Baseball player
 Mo Vaughn, retired Major League Baseball first baseman and designated hitter

Basketball
 Anthony Avent, former NBA player
 Andre Barrett, former NBA player
Khadeen Carrington (born 1995), Trinidadian-American basketball player for Hapoel Jerusalem of the Israeli Basketball Premier League
 Chuck Connors, former NBA player
 Samuel Dalembert, former NBA player
 Bob Davies, former NBA player
 Terry Dehere, former NBA player
 Walter Dukes, former NBA player
 Dick Fitzgerald, former NBA player
 Andrew Gaze, former Australian basketball player
 Romaro Gill, current NBA G League player
 Adrian Griffin, former NBA player
 Eddie Griffin, former NBA player
 Artūras Karnišovas, former professional basketball player in Europe, two-time Olympic bronze medalist, current executive vice president of basketball operations for the Chicago Bulls.
 Nikos Galis, former professional basketball player, Eurobasket 1987 Gold Medalist, FIBA's 50 Greatest Players (inaugural member, 1991)
 Paul Gause, former defensive specialist on Seton Hall's team
 Shaheen Holloway, former Pirates player and current Pirates men's head coach
 Howie Janotta, former NBA player
 Rimantas Kaukėnas, current professional basketball player in Europe
Tom Maayan (born 1993), Israeli basketball player in the Israeli National League
 Johnny Macknowski, former NBA player
 Sandro Mamukelashvili, currently under contract with the San Antonio Spurs
 Mike McCarron, former NBA player
 Quincy McKnight, currently an NBA G League player
 Harry Miller, former NBA player
 John Morton, former NBA player
 Glenn Mosley, former NBA player
 KC Ndefo, current Pirates player most notable as a key figure in Saint Peter's 2022 NCAA tournament run
 Al Negratti, former NBA player
 Myles Powell, currently under contract with the New York Knicks
 Ramon Ramos, former NBA player
 Richie Regan, former NBA player
 Ed Sadowski, former NBA player
 Pep Saul, former NBA player
 Ben Scharnus, former NBA player
 Jerry Walker, former NBA player
 Bobby Wanzer, former NBA player
 Nick Werkman, the NCAA's national scoring leader in 1962–63
 Isaiah Whitehead, currently on a two-way contract with the Detroit Pistons 
 Luther Wright, former NBA player

Soccer
 Jason Hernandez, former professional Major League Soccer player for New York City F.C.
 Ian Joyce, former Football League One player for Southend United
 Gordon Kljestan, retired USSF player for FC Tampa Bay
 Sacha Kljestan, retired professional soccer player who previously played for several teams in Major League Soccer, and the US Men's National Team
 Eoin Monaghan, former Shamrock Rovers player
 Kelly Smith, former player for the England women's national football team

Wrestling
 Charlie Haas, two-time Big East Wrestling Champion

Other sports
 Bart Oates (J.D.), football player, three-time Super Bowl champion and president of the New Jersey Hall of Fame

Track and Field
Johnny Gibson, former coach nationally renowned intermediate hurdler.
Andrew Valmon, Olympic gold medalist world record holder.
Andy Stanfield Olympic medalist.

Notable faculty

Samuel Alito, current United States Supreme Court Justice,
 Patrick Clawson, director of the Washington Institute for Near East Policy
 Clay Constantinou, U.S. Ambassador to Luxembourg and former dean of the Whitehead School of Diplomacy
 Will Durant, Pulitzer Prize-winning author and Presidential Medal of Freedom recipient
 Chas Fox, NFL player
 Orlando Greene, Olympic runner
 Patrick E. Hobbs, former Dean of Seton Hall Law School
 Stanley Jaki, philosopher of science and Templeton Prize recipient
 James F. Kelley, President of Seton Hall from 1933-1949. At the time of his appointment he was the youngest college president in the United States
 Leonard Marshall, New York Giants football player; Stillman School of business executive
 Andrew Napolitano, former judge and current correspondent for Fox News Channel
 Peter W. Rodino, former chairman of House Judiciary Committee and chair of impeachment hearings for President Richard Nixon
 Eliakim P. Scammon, brigadier general during the American Civil War
 Sister Rose Thering, missionary whose life's work was documented in an Academy Award-nominated film, Sister Rose's Passion
 John B. Tsu, Chinese-American professor of Asian studies and advocate for Asian-Americans
 Cody Willard, investor and television anchor

References

External links
 Seton Hall University Alumni Association
 Seton Hall University website

Lists of people by university or college in New Jersey